The 2015–16 ISU Grand Prix of Figure Skating was a series of senior invitational internationals which ran from October 23 to December 13, 2015. Medals were awarded in the disciplines of men's singles, ladies' singles, pair skating, and ice dancing. Skaters earned points based on their placement at each event and the top six in each discipline qualified to compete at the Grand Prix Final, held in Barcelona, Spain.

Organized by the International Skating Union, the series set the stage for the 2016 Europeans, the 2016 Four Continents, and the 2016 World Championships. The corresponding series for junior-level skaters was the 2015–16 ISU Junior Grand Prix.

Schedule
The series was composed of the following events:

Assignments
The preliminary Grand Prix assignments were announced on June 15, 2015.

Men

Ladies

Pairs

Ice dance

Changes to preliminary assignments

Skate America
 On August 21, three out of the four host picks were announced as Ross Miner, Karen Chen, and Gretchen Donlan / Nathan Bartholomay.
 On August 26, the fourth host pick was officially announced as Anastasia Cannuscio / Colin McManus.
 On October 21, Gretchen Donlan / Nathan Bartholomay were replaced by Jessica Pfund / Joshua Santillan as Donlan / Bartholomay withdrew due to Donlan recovering from an illness.

Skate Canada International
 On July 24, Ronald Lam announced his retirement. He was officially removed from the roster on August 21. On September 4, he was officially replaced with Kim Jin-seo.
 On August 21, Véronik Mallet was announced as a host pick.
 On September 2, Vanessa Grenier / Maxime Deschamps, and Élisabeth Paradis / François-Xavier Ouellette were announced as host picks.
 On September 24, Joshua Farris was removed from the roster due to a concussion. On September 25, it was announced that he was replaced by Timothy Dolensky. Dolensky was officially added to the roster on September 28.
 On October 16, Elene Gedevanishvili was removed from the roster. No reason has been given. On October 19, her replacement was announced as Isabelle Olsson.
 On October 22, Peter Liebers was replaced by Sei Kawahara. No reason has been given.

Cup of China
 On August 17, Daniel Samohin and Lina Fedorova / Maxim Miroshkin were removed from the roster. No reasons were given. However, Samohin is not eligible to compete on the Senior Grand Prix circuit due to competing on the Junior Grand Prix this season. On August 21, Elladj Baldé and Vanessa Grenier / Maxime Deschamps were announced as their replacements.
 On September 15, Zhao Ziquan, Zheng Lu, and Cong Yue / Sun Zhuoming were added as host picks.
 On October 6, Madeline Aaron / Max Settlage were removed from the roster. No reason has been given. Their replacement was announced as Mari Vartmann / Ruben Blommaert.
 On October 15, Takahiko Kozuka was removed from the roster due to an injury. On October 16, his replacement was announced as Ivan Righini.
 On November 5, China's Cong / Sun withdrew from the ice dancing event due to a medical reason.

Trophée Éric Bompard
 On August 14, Kiira Korpi was removed from the roster. On August 21, her replacement was announced as Roberta Rodeghiero. On August 27, it was announced that Korpi had retired.
 On September 14, Chafik Besseghier was added as a host pick.
 On September 23, Brooklee Han, Miriam Ziegler / Severin Kiefer, Sara Hurtado / Adrià Díaz, and Alisa Agafonova / Alper Uçar were added to the roster in place of host picks.
 On September 28, Misha Ge was removed from the roster due to visa problems. On October 15, Kim Jin-seo was announced as his replacement.
 On October 16, Sara Hurtado / Adrià Díaz were removed from the roster. It was announced that the couple had split, because Hurtado had dissolved the partnership. On October 26, their replacement was announced as Laurence Fournier Beaudry / Nikolaj Sørensen.
 On November 6, Florent Amodio was removed from the roster due to an injury. No replacement was made.
 On November 11, Gabriella Papadakis / Guillaume Cizeron withdrew due to Papadakis not having fully recovered from her concussion. No replacement was made.

Rostelecom Cup
 On September 14, Adelina Sotnikova, Natalja Zabijako / Alexander Enbert, and Victoria Sinitsina / Nikita Katsalapov were added as a host picks.
 On October 16, Sara Hurtado / Adrià Díaz were removed from the roster. It was announced that the couple had split, because Hurtado had dissolved the partnership. On October 26, their replacement was announced as Viktoria Kavaliova / Yurii Bieliaiev.

NHK Trophy
 On September 9, Kana Muramoto / Chris Reed, Mariko Kihara, and Keiji Tanaka were added as host picks.
 On September 24, Joshua Farris was removed from the roster due to a concussion. On September 28, his replacement was announced as Grant Hochstein.
 On November 11, Gabriella Papadakis / Guillaume Cizeron withdrew due to Papadakis not having fully recovered from her concussion. On November 17, Penny Coomes / Nicholas Buckland were announced as their replacement.
 On November 20, Tatiana Volosozhar / Maxim Trankov withdrew due to an injury to Volosozhar. They were replaced by Amani Fancy / Christopher Boyadji. Ice dancers Alexandra Paul / Mitchell Islam also withdrew. On November 21, they were replaced by Anastasia Cannuscio / Colin McManus.
 On November 21, Jason Brown withdrew due to a back strain injury. On November 23, he was replaced by Brendan Kerry.
 On November 23, Maé-Bérénice Méité withdrew from the ladies' event.

Medal summary

Medalists

Medal standings

Qualification 
At each event, skaters earned points toward qualification for the Grand Prix Final. Following the sixth event, the top six highest scoring skaters/teams advanced to the Final. The points earned per placement were as follows:

There were originally seven tie-breakers in cases of a tie in overall points:
	Highest placement at an event. If a skater placed 1st and 3rd, the tiebreaker is the 1st place, and that beats a skater who placed 2nd in both events.
	Highest combined total scores in both events. If a skater earned 200 points at one event and 250 at a second, that skater would win in the second tie-break over a skater who earned 200 points at one event and 150 at another.
	Participated in two events.
	Highest combined scores in the free skating/free dancing portion of both events.
	Highest individual score in the free skating/free dancing portion from one event.
	Highest combined scores in the short program/short dance of both events.
	Highest number of total participants at the events.

However, due to the cancellation of the free skating/dance at Trophée Éric Bompard, the International Skating Union revised the tie-breakers to the following:

	Highest placement at an event. If a skater placed 1st and 3rd, the tiebreaker is the 1st place, and that beats a skater who placed 2nd in both events.
	Highest combined scores in the short program/short dance of both events.
	Participated in two events.
	Highest number of total participants at the events.

If a tie remained, it was considered unbreakable and the tied skaters all advanced to the Grand Prix Final.

Qualification standings
Bold denotes Grand Prix Final qualification.

Qualifiers 
Due to the cancellation of the free skating/dance at the Trophée Éric Bompard, the International Skating Union announced an exception to the qualification criteria. For the skaters who placed seventh in qualifying for the Grand Prix Final, if they competed at Trophée Bompard, they would receive an invite to the Final.

Top Grand Prix scores

Men

Total score

Short program

Free program

Ladies

Total score

Short program

Free program

Pairs

Total score

Short program

Free program

Ice dance

Total score

Short dance

Free dance

References 

Isu Grand Prix Of Figure Skating, 2015-16
ISU Grand Prix of Figure Skating